The men's tournament of the 2015 World Senior Curling Championships was held from April 18 to 25 at the Iceberg Skating Palace in Sochi, Russia.

Teams
The teams are listed as follows:

Group A

Group B

Group C

Round-robin standings
Final round-robin standings

Round-robin results

Group A

Saturday, April 18
Draw 1
8:00

Draw 3
17:00

Sunday, April 19
Draw 5
8:00

Draw 6
12:00

Draw 7
16:00

Draw 8
20:00

Monday, April 20
Draw 11
16:00

Draw 12
20:00

Tuesday, April 21
Draw 15
16:00

Wednesday, April 22
Draw 17
8:00

Draw 20
20:00

Thursday, April 23
Draw 22
12:00

Draw 24
20:00

Group B

Saturday, April 18
Draw 2
13:15

Draw 3
17:00

Sunday, April 19
Draw 5
8:00

Monday, April 20
Draw 10
12:00

Draw 11
16:00

Tuesday, April 21
Draw 13
8:00

Draw 14
12:00

Wednesday, April 22
Draw 18
12:00

Draw 20
20:00

Thursday, April 23
Draw 22
12:00

Draw 24
20:00

Group C

Saturday, April 18
Draw 4
20:45

Sunday, April 19
Draw 6
12:00

Monday, April 20
Draw 9
8:00

Draw 10
12:00

Draw 12
20:00

Tuesday, April 21
Draw 13
8:00

Draw 14
12:00

Draw 15
16:00

Draw 16
20:00

Wednesday, April 22
Draw 19
16:00

Thursday, April 23
Draw 21
8:00

Tiebreaker
Friday, April 24, 9:00

Playoffs

Qualification Game
Friday, April 24, 14:00

Quarterfinals
Friday, April 24, 19:00

Semifinals
Saturday, April 25, 8:00

Bronze medal game
Saturday, April 25, 13:00

Gold medal game
Saturday, April 25, 13:00

References

External links

World Senior Curling Championships
2015 in curling
2015 in Russian sport
International curling competitions hosted by Russia